{{Infobox military person
|name= Mauricio Jaramillo
|birth_date= 
|nickname="Mauricio Jaramillo""Wilson Valderrama Cano" "'''El Médico"
|birth_place= La Macarena, Meta Colombia
|death_place= 
|allegiance=

|branch=
|serviceyears=
|rank= Secretariat member, Bloc commander
|unit= 
|commands=
|battles= Colombian conflict
Catatumbo campaign
|awards=
|relations=
|laterwork=
}}Mauricio Jaramillo (born 1952) is the nom de guerre of Jaime Alberto Parra, known as El Médico or Wilson Valderrama Cano'  a former high-ranking guerrilla commander of the Revolutionary Armed Forces of Colombia (FARC), also known as El Médico (the medic). Jaramillo became a member of the FARC Secretariat in March 2008, replacing Iván Ríos.

According to reports by Colombian authorities, Jaramillo was responsible for the set up of medical facilities in the middle of jungle for the FARC, as well as setting up medical and sanitation training for FARC combatants. He was also the personal doctor of ailing FARC commander Manuel Marulanda.

Early years
According to a report by Colombian newspaper El Espectador Jaramillo graduated from the National University of Colombia in Medicine. Parra escalated through FARC ranks rapidly because of his professional background in medicine and became part of the higher command of the FARC, which is formed by some 30 top commanders including the seven members of the secretariat. In 1993 Jaramillo was selected to be the possible successor of guerrilla leader Ivan Rios.

According to a report by Colombian daily El Tiempo'', Jaramillo might have studied medicine in Cuba, and also lived in Mexico for eight years along FARC "chancellor" Marcos Calarca.

Modus operandi
According to reports by Colombian intelligence, Jaramillo is considered to be a mobile guerrilla leader, without a base camp, moving continuously to visit the different guerrilla fronts. He participated in the guerrilla assaults on the towns of Mitú and Miraflores.

References

Living people
Members of FARC
Colombian communists
Anti-revisionists
1952 births
People from Meta Department